The parliamentarian of the United States House of Representatives manages, supervises, and administers the Office of the Parliamentarian, which is responsible for advising the House's presiding officers, members, and staff on procedural questions under the U.S. Constitution and House rules and precedents, as well as for preparing, compiling, and publishing the precedents of the House.

Role
The parliamentarian is appointed by the speaker of the House of Representatives without regard to political affiliation and solely on the basis of fitness to perform the duties of the position. Advice from the parliamentarian's office is confidential upon request.

The parliamentarian, or an assistant parliamentarian, usually sits or stands to the right of the Speaker or Speaker pro tempore (or the Chair of the Committee of the Whole House on the State of the Union, when the House has resolved into that forum) and advises that presiding officer how to respond to such things as parliamentary inquiries, points of order, and the ordinary workings of the procedures of the House.

The legitimacy of parliamentary procedure in the House depends on nonpartisan procedural advice that is transparently consistent. The parliamentarian achieves the requisite consistency by fidelity to precedent, and the requisite transparency by publication. The publications of the Office of the Parliamentarian range from a biennial deskbook to a decennial hornbook to a perennial series of formal precedents. The House Rules and Manual – comprising the Constitution, Jefferson’s Manual, and the rules of the House, each with parliamentary annotations – is the biennial publication that ensures that legislative practitioners have access to the most up-to-date citations of authority on legislative and parliamentary procedure. As such it might be the single most useful tool a legislative practitioner could have. 

Probably the most important job of the Office of the Parliamentarian in the long term is the compilation of the precedents. The commitment of the House to the principle of stare decisis in its procedural practice – the idea that fidelity to precedent cultivates levels of consistency and transparency that, in turn, foster fairness in the resolution of questions of order – depends implicitly on the compilation of precedents. Being rigorous about what constitutes actual legal precedent and striving to apply pertinent precedent to each procedural question engenders consistency, and therefore transparency, in procedural practice and, consequently, enhances the perceived legitimacy and fairness, and therefore the integrity, of the proceedings of the House.

Parliamentarians
The position of parliamentarian was previously known as the "Clerk at the Speaker's table," in which capacity the noted parliamentarian Asher Hinds served as an adviser to the powerful Speakers "Czar" Reed and "Uncle Joe" Cannon, who used precedent and procedure to facilitate their assertive management of House business (both were excoriated by opponents as "czarlike" or "tyrannical").

A parliamentarian has been appointed by the speaker in every Congress since 1927. In the 95th Congress, the House formally established an Office of the Parliamentarian to be managed by a nonpartisan parliamentarian appointed by the speaker. The compilation and distribution of the precedents of the House are authorized by law (et seq.). The current parliamentarian is Jason A. Smith.

The following have served as House parliamentarian:

See also
Parliamentarian of the United States Senate

References

Further reading
The Office of the Parliamentarian in the House and Senate Congressional Research Service

Employees of the United States House of Representatives